Project Peshawar is a 2017 Pakistani multi-lingual suspense thriller film. It was Khyber Pakhtunkhwa's first international release, produced in Pashto, Urdu, Dutch and English. Project Peshawar was particularly popular in global media because Peshawar, the capital of the province, was under militant rule for years. 

Project Peshawar  is a unique blend of eastern and western cultures highlighting the negative side of the modern-day social media boom. The film also highlights the importance and legacy of the city of Peshawar at national and international levels. This film changed the trend and revived Pashto cinema due to its production quality and talented cast members.

Plot 
The story is based on real life incidents, highlighting the negative side of the modern-day social media boom, and is intended to raise awareness as to how some people use social media negatively. Project Peshawar is based on a true story and revolves around a British Pakistani who falls in love with a Peshawar-based girl on the internet, and travels back to Pakistan for her only to realize that it was merely a trap to capture him.

Cast 
 Shoaib Lodin
 Navishta Sahar
 Sally Ingry
 Moez Mohmand
 Mihela Bursc
 Arbab Izhar Ahmad
 James Ryan
 Mustafa Khan
 Mariyam
Dilawar Jan

Filming 
Principal photography took place in United Kingdom, the Netherlands, and Pakistan, with 70% of the production in Peshawar. The male lead of the film, Shoaib Lodin, who also acted as a consultant producer on the film, is an Afghani-Dutch citizen who left Peshawar in 1997. He is a graduate of the Film and Television Institute of India.

Release 
Project Peshawar released on 20 August 2017 in Peshawar, premiering in Nishtar Hall. The premiere was sponsored by Jeans Films and the Tourism Corporation of Khyber Pakhtunkhwa. It was later shown at film festivals in the United States, Canada and the Netherlands.

Critical reception 
Film-maker Irshu Bangash told The Express Tribune that there have been people from the local entertainment industry who are trying to sabotage the film, claiming that it spreads a negative image of the city and "promotes western values" instead of local cultural values. Bangash shared how they decided to do a film about social media and how it's misused. "We see it all around us. Even Mashal Khan's case was elevated due to social media and its power," he said. "It's funny because these are our seniors, yet a lot of vulgar content has been released without any objections because of the lack of censor board in Khyber Pakhtunkhwa." He added there were Local Media Groups and Pashto cinema artists who were trying to sabotage the premiere as well "because we didn't allow them to film in the theater during the premiere. It's obvious, one can't allow anyone to record the film on its premiere.”

Official website

Soundtrack
Musicians involved in the production of the soundtrack include Fortitude, Khumariyaan, King Compass and the duo of Naseer & Shahab.

References 

2017 films
Films shot in Peshawar
2010s Urdu-language films
Pashto-language films
2010s Dutch-language films
2010s English-language films
Films shot in Amsterdam
Films set in Peshawar
Pakistani independent films
Pakistani thriller films
English-language Pakistani films
2017 independent films
2017 multilingual films
Pakistani multilingual films